Bakhmetevsky Bus Garage was a public bus garage in Moscow, designed in 1926 by Konstantin Melnikov (floorplan concept and architectural design) and Vladimir Shukhov (structural engineering). The building, completed in 1927, was an example of applying avant-garde architectural methods to an industrial facility. Neglected for decades and nearly condemned to demolition, it was restored in 2007–2008 and reopened in September 2008 as a gallery of modern art.

Original design
In 1925, Melnikov travelled to Paris. Back in Moscow, Melnikov saw a new fleet of Leyland buses tucked into a narrow yard in Bolshaya Ordynka Street. He approached city transportation board and sold his idea for a free-flow garage. It was built on a large lot in Bakhmetevskaya Street, 11 (then a working class suburb north from Garden Ring; later, the street was renamed Obraztsova Street). Bakhmetevsky Garage, sometimes associated with constructivist architecture, was in fact styled in an indefinite red-brick industrial livery; circular windows in the attic are the only avant-garde features (and even these were destroyed decades ago).

Later development
Melnikov also designed workshops and office buildings on the same lot, filling the irregular voids made by placing a parallelogram-shaped garage on a larger, rectangular lot.

Preservation attempts

In 1990, the aging garage was listed as an architectural memorial. In 2001, the bus company vacated the building and the City Hall donated it to the Moscow Hasidic Jewish Community Center for redevelopment, on condition that the Community Center build a public school on the same lot and return it to the City. The Community Center approached architect Alexey Vorontsov to design the whole project. Before the drafts were completed in 2001, the builders removed the roofing and began disassembling the roof trusses, destroying eight spans. Public intervention suspended further destruction; Vorontsov persuaded the client to hire a professional restoration bureau to assess the extent and cost of preservation. Eventually, in 2003, the Community Center and the authorities agreed upon a compromise development plan by Vorontsov that would retain the original exterior walls. A public school, however, was to be completed next to Melnikov's garage, leaving the Jewish community with an opportunity to build another cultural institution that incorporated the facade of Melnikov's 1928 building.

After years of neglect, work accelerated in the second half of 2007. The garage was fully restored externally in the first half of 2008 complete with 1920-s style lettering on the eastern (entrance) facade; interior work was completed by Jamie Fobert Architects in September 2008. The building was reopened to the public in September as the Garage Center for Contemporary Culture (abbreviated in Russian as CCC), featuring an exhibition of Ilya and Emilia Kabakov. A new gallery provides 8,500 square meters of exhibition space. The Center is managed by Daria Zhukova; the speed and expense of the 2007–2008 restoration project is attributed to the sponsorship of Roman Abramovich, who chairs the board of trustees for the Federation of Jewish Communities of Russia.

On the day of inauguration of the art gallery Alexander Boroda, president of the Federation of Jewish Communities of Russia, announced plans to convert the garage into a "Jewish Museum of Tolerance" to open in 2011. The museum will share space with the art gallery. The Jewish Museum and Tolerance Center opened on November 10, 2012 and is since 2013 home of about five hundred books as part of the Schneersohn-Library confiscated by the Soviet Union in the 1920s.

References

External links

Bakhmetevsky Bus Garage
3d model of Bakhmetevsky Bus Garage 
Russian: Redevelopment plan in detail, 2003, PDF format

Buildings and structures in Moscow
Roof structures by Vladimir Shukhov
Constructivist architecture
Modernist architecture in Russia
Russian avant-garde
Energy infrastructure completed in 1927
Tourist attractions in Moscow
Buildings and structures built in the Soviet Union
Cultural heritage monuments of regional significance in Moscow